The 1962 European Women's Basketball Championship was the 8th regional championship held by FIBA Europe for women. The competition was held in Mulhouse, France and took place on September 22–29, 1962. The Soviet Union won their sixth gold medal (third in a row) while Czechoslovakia and Bulgaria won silver and bronze, respectively.

Preliminary round
The teams where divided into two groups. The first two from each group would advance to the bracket that defined the first four places. The system to determine the 5th–10th places consisted in three final matches between teams that had the same position in both groups.

Group A

Group B

Classification

5th place match

7th place match

9th place match

Medal Bracket

Final standings

External links

 FIBA Archive

1962
1962 in women's basketball
1962 in French women's sport
International women's basketball competitions hosted by France
September 1962 sports events in Europe
Women